Sasu Cha Swayamwar  is a 2015 Marathi romantic comedy movie written and directed by Omkar Mane. It stars Pushkar Jog, Teja Deokar, Vishaka Subhedar, Vijay Chavan, Satish Tare, Jaywant Wadkar and Sunil Pal. The film is produced by Seven Seas Motion Pictures. The film will be released on 24 April 2015.

Plot
The frustrated Mohan seeks an eligible groom for his interfering Sasu. that he has inherited in his dowry. The unwanted dowry takes his life through various levels of hell so he arranges a swayamwara and story starts happening. To palm off his Sasu he finds three bachelors. This story is all about how the Sasu gets married and lead to an unexpected ending.

Cast
 Pushkar Jog as Mohan Dekhne
 Teja Deokar as Nandini Dekhne
 Vishakha Subhedar as Lalitadevi
 Vijay Chavan as Sartape
 Jaywant Wadkar as Chadda Singh
 Satish Tare as Dr. Belapure
 Sunil Pal as Baji
 Bhargavi Chirmule as Bhargavi Chirmule

Awards
Salam Pune Awards

Best Young Director – Omkar Mane

Best Actress in Comic role – Vishakha Subhedar

External links
 
 http://maharashtratimes.indiatimes.com/movie-masti/cine-news/-/moviearticleshow/20619072.cms

2010s Marathi-language films